Jupiter is the fifth planet from the Sun and the largest in the Solar System. It is a gas giant with a mass more than two and a half times that of all the other planets in the Solar System combined, and slightly less than one one-thousandth the mass of the Sun. Jupiter is the third brightest natural object in the Earth's night sky after the Moon and Venus, and it has been observed since prehistoric times. It was named after Jupiter, the chief deity of ancient Roman religion.

Jupiter is primarily composed of hydrogen, followed by helium, which constitutes a quarter of its mass and a tenth of its volume. The ongoing contraction of Jupiter's interior generates more heat than the planet receives from the Sun. Because of its rapid rotation rate of 1 rotation per 10 hours, the planet's shape is an oblate spheroid: it has a slight but noticeable bulge around the equator. The outer atmosphere is divided into a series of latitudinal bands, with turbulence and storms along their interacting boundaries. A prominent result of this is the Great Red Spot, a giant storm which has been observed since at least 1831.

Jupiter is surrounded by a faint planetary ring system and has a powerful magnetosphere. Jupiter has 95 known moons and probably many more, including the four large moons discovered by Galileo Galilei in 1610: Io, Europa, Ganymede, and Callisto. Ganymede, the largest of the four, is larger than the planet Mercury. Callisto is the second largest; Io and Europa are approximately the size of Earth's moon.

Pioneer 10 was the first spacecraft to visit Jupiter, making its closest approach to the planet in December 1973. Jupiter has since been explored by multiple robotic spacecraft, beginning with the Pioneer and Voyager flyby missions from 1973 to 1979. The Galileo orbiter arrived in orbit around Jupiter in 1995. In 2007, New Horizons visited Jupiter for a gravity assist to increase its speed and bend its trajectory on the way to Pluto. The latest probe to visit Jupiter, Juno, entered its orbit in July 2016. Future targets for exploration in the Jupiter system include its moon Europa, which probably has an ice-covered liquid ocean which scientists think could sustain life.

Name and symbol 
In both the ancient Greek and Roman civilizations, Jupiter was named after the chief god of the divine pantheon: Zeus to the Greeks and Jupiter to the Romans. The International Astronomical Union formally adopted the name Jupiter for the planet in 1976, and has since named its newly discovered satellites for the god's lovers, favourites, and descendants. The planetary symbol for Jupiter, descends from a Greek zeta with a horizontal stroke, as an abbreviation for Zeus.

In Germanic mythology, Jupiter is equated to Thor, the namesake of Thursday. It has been theorized that this replaced the Latin name for the day, Dies Iovi ('Day of Jupiter'). The Latin name Iovis is associated with the etymology of Zeus ('sky father'). The English equivalent, Jove, is only known to have come into use as a poetic name for the planet around the 14th century.

The original Greek deity Zeus supplies the root zeno-, which is used to form some Jupiter-related words, such as zenographic. Jovian is the adjectival form of Jupiter. The older adjectival form jovial, employed by astrologers in the Middle Ages, has come to mean 'happy' or 'merry', moods ascribed to Jupiter's influence in astrology.

Formation and migration 
 
Jupiter is believed to be the oldest planet in the Solar System. Current models of Solar System formation suggest that Jupiter formed at or beyond the snow line: a distance from the early Sun where the temperature is sufficiently cold for volatiles such as water to condense into solids. The planet began as a solid core, which then accumulated its gaseous atmosphere. As a consequence, the planet must have formed before the solar nebula was fully dispersed. During its formation, Jupiter's mass gradually increased until it had 20 times the mass of the Earth, approximately half of which was made up of silicates, ices and other heavy-element constituents. When the proto-Jupiter grew larger than 50 Earth masses it created a gap in the solar nebula. Thereafter, the growing planet reached its final masses in 3–4 million years.

As the young planet accreted mass, interaction with the gas disk orbiting the Sun and orbital resonances with Saturn caused it to migrate inward. This upset the orbits of several super-Earths orbiting closer to the Sun, causing them to collide destructively. This changed the direction of migration, causing them to migrate away from the Sun and out of the inner system to their current locations. All of this happened over a period of 3–6 million years, with the final migration of Jupiter occurring over several hundred thousand years. Jupiter's departure from the inner solar system eventually allowed the inner planets—including Earth—to form from the rubble.

There are several problems with the grand tack hypothesis. The resulting formation timescales of terrestrial planets appear to be inconsistent with the measured elemental composition. It is likely that Jupiter would have settled into an orbit much closer to the Sun if it had migrated through the solar nebula. Some competing models of Solar System formation predict the formation of Jupiter with orbital properties that are close to those of the present day planet.

Having formed at one of these extreme distances, Jupiter would then have migrated inwards to its current location. This inward migration would have occurred over a roughly 700,000-year period, during an epoch approximately 2–3 million years after the planet began to form. In this model, Saturn, Uranus and Neptune would have formed even further out than Jupiter, and Saturn would also have migrated inwards.

Physical characteristics 
Jupiter is a gas giant, being primarily composed of gas and liquid rather than solid matter. The average density of Jupiter, 1.326 g/cm3, is about the same as simple syrup (syrup USP), and is lower than those of the four terrestrial planets.

Composition 
Jupiter's upper atmosphere is about 90% hydrogen and 10% helium by volume. Since helium atoms are more massive than hydrogen molecules, Jupiter's atmosphere is approximately 24% helium by mass. The atmosphere also contains trace amounts of methane, water vapour, ammonia, and silicon-based compounds. There are also fractional amounts of carbon, ethane, hydrogen sulfide, neon, oxygen, phosphine, and sulfur. The outermost layer of the atmosphere contains crystals of frozen ammonia. Through infrared and ultraviolet measurements, trace amounts of benzene and other hydrocarbons have also been found. The interior of Jupiter contains denser materials—by mass it is roughly 71% hydrogen, 24% helium, and 5% other elements.

The atmospheric proportions of hydrogen and helium are close to the theoretical composition of the primordial solar nebula. Neon in the upper atmosphere only consists of 20 parts per million by mass, which is about a tenth as abundant as in the Sun. Helium is also reduced to about 80% of the Sun's helium composition. This depletion is a result of precipitation of these elements as helium-rich droplets, a process that happens deep in the interior of the planet.

Based on spectroscopy, Saturn is thought to be similar in composition to Jupiter, but the other giant planets Uranus and Neptune have relatively less hydrogen and helium and relatively more of the next most common elements, including oxygen, carbon, nitrogen, and sulfur. Those planets are known as ice giants, because the majority of their volatile compounds are in solid form.

Size and mass 

Jupiter's mass is 2.5 times that of all the other planets in the Solar System combined—so massive that its barycentre with the Sun lies above the Sun's surface at 1.068 solar radii from the Sun's centre. Jupiter is much larger than Earth and considerably less dense: it has 1,321 times the volume of the Earth, but only 318 times the mass. Jupiter's radius is about one tenth the radius of the Sun, and its mass is one thousandth the mass of the Sun, as the densities of the two bodies are similar. A "Jupiter mass" ( or ) is often used as a unit to describe masses of other objects, particularly extrasolar planets and brown dwarfs.

Theoretical models indicate that if Jupiter had over 40% more mass, the interior would be so compressed that its volume would decrease despite the increasing amount of matter. For smaller changes in its mass, the radius would not change appreciably. As a result, Jupiter is thought to have about as large a diameter as a planet of its composition and evolutionary history can achieve. The process of further shrinkage with increasing mass would continue until appreciable stellar ignition was achieved. Although Jupiter would need to be about 75 times more massive to fuse hydrogen and become a star, its diameter is sufficient as the smallest red dwarf may be only slightly larger in radius than Saturn.

Jupiter radiates more heat than it receives through solar radiation, due to the Kelvin–Helmholtz mechanism within its contracting interior. This process causes Jupiter to shrink by about /yr. At the time of its formation, Jupiter was hotter and was about twice its current diameter.

Internal structure 

Before the early 21st century, most scientists proposed one of two scenarios for the formation of Jupiter. If the planet accreted first as a solid body, it would consist of a dense core, a surrounding layer of liquid metallic hydrogen (with some helium) extending outward to about 80% of the radius of the planet, and an outer atmosphere consisting primarily of molecular hydrogen. Alternatively, if the planet collapsed directly from the gaseous protoplanetary disk, it was expected to completely lack a core, consisting instead of denser and denser fluid (predominantly molecular and metallic hydrogen) all the way to the centre. Data from the Juno mission showed that Jupiter has a diffuse core that mixes into its mantle. This mixing process could have arisen during formation, while the planet accreted solids and gases from the surrounding nebula. Alternatively, it could have been caused by an impact from a planet of about ten Earth masses a few million years after Jupiter's formation, which would have disrupted an originally solid Jovian core. It is estimated that the core takes up 30–50% of the planet's radius, and contains heavy elements with a combined mass 7–25 times the Earth.

Outside the layer of metallic hydrogen lies a transparent interior atmosphere of hydrogen. In this state, there are no distinct liquid and gas phases—hydrogen is said to be in a supercritical fluid state. The hydrogen and helium gas extending downward from the cloud layer gradually transitions to a liquid in deeper layers, possibly resembling something akin to an ocean of liquid hydrogen and other supercritical fluids. Physically, the gas gradually becomes hotter and denser as depth increases.

Rain-like droplets of helium and neon precipitate downward through the lower atmosphere, depleting the abundance of these elements in the upper atmosphere. Rainfalls of diamonds have been suggested to occur, as well as on Saturn and the ice giants Uranus and Neptune.

The temperature and pressure inside Jupiter increase steadily inward as the heat of planetary formation can only escape by convection.

Atmosphere 

Cloud layers 

Jupiter is perpetually covered with clouds of ammonia crystals, which may contain ammonium hydrosulfide as well. The clouds are located in the tropopause layer of the atmosphere, forming bands at different latitudes, known as tropical regions. These are subdivided into lighter-hued zones and darker belts. The interactions of these conflicting circulation patterns cause storms and turbulence. The zones have been observed to vary in width, colour and intensity from year to year, but they have remained stable enough for scientists to name them.

There may be a thin layer of water clouds underlying the ammonia clouds, as suggested by flashes of lightning detected in the atmosphere of Jupiter. These electrical discharges can be up to a thousand times as powerful as lightning on Earth. The water clouds are assumed to generate thunderstorms in the same way as terrestrial thunderstorms, driven by the heat rising from the interior. The Juno mission revealed the presence of "shallow lightning" which originates from ammonia-water clouds relatively high in the atmosphere. These discharges carry "mushballs" of water-ammonia slushes covered in ice, which fall deep into the atmosphere. Upper-atmospheric lightning has been observed in Jupiter's upper atmosphere, bright flashes of light that last around 1.4 milliseconds. These are known as "elves" or "sprites" and appear blue or pink due to the hydrogen.

The orange and brown colours in the clouds of Jupiter are caused by upwelling compounds that change colour when they are exposed to ultraviolet light from the Sun. The exact makeup remains uncertain, but the substances are thought to be made up of phosphorus, sulfur or possibly hydrocarbons. These colourful compounds, known as chromophores, mix with the warmer clouds of the lower deck. The light-coloured zones are formed when rising convection cells form crystallising ammonia that hides the chromophores from view.

Jupiter has a low axial tilt, thus making it that the poles always receive less solar radiation than the planet's equatorial region. Convection within the interior of the planet transports energy to the poles, balancing out the temperatures at the cloud layer.

Great Red Spot and other vortices 

A  well-known feature of Jupiter is the Great Red Spot, a persistent anticyclonic storm located 22° south of the equator. It is known to have existed since at least 1831, and possibly since 1665. Images by the Hubble Space Telescope have shown two more "red spots" adjacent to the Great Red Spot. The storm is visible through Earth-based telescopes with an aperture of 12 cm or larger. The oval object rotates counterclockwise, with a period of about six days. The Spot's composition and the source of its red colour remain uncertain, although photodissociated ammonia reacting with acetylene is a likely explanation.

The Great Red Spot is larger than the Earth. Mathematical models suggest that the storm is stable and will be a permanent feature of the planet. However, it has significantly decreased in size since its discovery.

Juno missions show that there are several polar cyclone groups at Jupiter's poles. The northern group contains nine cyclones, with a large one in the centre and eight others around it, while its southern counterpart also consists of a centre vortex but is surrounded by five large storms and a single smaller one for a total of 7 storms. These polar structures are caused by the turbulence in Jupiter's atmosphere and can be compared with the hexagon at Saturn's north pole.

In 2000, an atmospheric feature formed in the southern hemisphere that is similar in appearance to the Great Red Spot, but smaller. This was created when smaller, white oval-shaped storms merged to form a single feature—these three smaller white ovals were formed in 1939–1940. The merged feature was named Oval BA. It has since increased in intensity and changed from white to red, earning it the nickname "Little Red Spot".

In April 2017, a "Great Cold Spot" was discovered in Jupiter's thermosphere at its north pole. While this spot changes form and intensity over the short term, it has maintained its general position in the atmosphere for more than 15 years. It may be a giant vortex similar to the Great Red Spot, and appears to be quasi-stable like the vortices in Earth's thermosphere. This feature may be formed by interactions between charged particles generated from Io and the strong magnetic field of Jupiter, resulting in a redistribution of heat flow.

Magnetosphere 

Jupiter's magnetic field is the strongest of any planet in the Solar System, with a dipole moment of  that is tilted at an angle of 10.31° to the pole of rotation. This field is thought to be generated by eddy currents—swirling movements of conducting materials—within the liquid, metallic hydrogen core. At about 75 Jupiter radii from the planet, the interaction of the magnetosphere with the solar wind generates a bow shock. Surrounding Jupiter's magnetosphere is a magnetopause, located at the inner edge of a magnetosheath—a region between it and the bow shock. The solar wind interacts with these regions, elongating the magnetosphere on Jupiter's lee side and extending it outward until it nearly reaches the orbit of Saturn. The four largest moons of Jupiter all orbit within the magnetosphere, which protects them from the solar wind.

The volcanoes on the moon Io emit large amounts of sulfur dioxide, forming a gas torus along its orbit. The gas is ionized in Jupiter's magnetosphere, producing sulfur and oxygen ions. They, together with hydrogen ions originating from the atmosphere of Jupiter, form a plasma sheet in Jupiter's equatorial plane. The plasma in the sheet co-rotates with the planet, causing deformation of the dipole magnetic field into that of a magnetodisk. Electrons within the plasma sheet generate a strong radio signature, with short, superimposed bursts in the range of 0.6–30 MHz that are detectable from Earth with consumer-grade shortwave radio receivers. As Io moves through this torus, the interaction generates Alfvén waves that carry ionized matter into the polar regions of Jupiter. As a result, radio waves are generated through a cyclotron maser mechanism, and the energy is transmitted out along a cone-shaped surface. When Earth intersects this cone, the radio emissions from Jupiter can exceed the radio output of the Sun.

Planetary rings 

Jupiter has a faint planetary ring system composed of three main segments: an inner torus of particles known as the halo, a relatively bright main ring, and an outer gossamer ring. These rings appear to be made of dust, whereas Saturn's rings are made of ice. The main ring is most likely made out of material ejected from the satellites Adrastea and Metis, which is drawn into Jupiter because of the planet's strong gravitational influence. New material is added by additional impacts. In a similar way, the moons Thebe and Amalthea are believed to produce the two distinct components of the dusty gossamer ring. There is evidence of a fourth ring that may consist of collisional debris from Amalthea that is strung along the same moon's orbit.

Orbit and rotation 

Jupiter is the only planet whose barycentre with the Sun lies outside the volume of the Sun, though by only 7% of the Sun's radius. The average distance between Jupiter and the Sun is 778 million km (5.2 AU) and it completes an orbit every 11.86 years. This is approximately two-fifths the orbital period of Saturn, forming a near orbital resonance. The orbital plane of Jupiter is inclined 1.30° compared to Earth. Because the eccentricity of its orbit is 0.049, Jupiter is slightly over 75 million km nearer the Sun at perihelion than aphelion.

The axial tilt of Jupiter is relatively small, only 3.13°, so its seasons are insignificant compared to those of Earth and Mars.

Jupiter's rotation is the fastest of all the Solar System's planets, completing a rotation on its axis in slightly less than ten hours; this creates an equatorial bulge easily seen through an amateur telescope. Because Jupiter is not a solid body, its upper atmosphere undergoes differential rotation. The rotation of Jupiter's polar atmosphere is about 5 minutes longer than that of the equatorial atmosphere. The planet is an oblate spheroid, meaning that the diameter across its equator is longer than the diameter measured between its poles. On Jupiter, the equatorial diameter is  longer than the polar diameter.

Three systems are used as frames of reference for tracking the planetary rotation, particularly when graphing the motion of atmospheric features. System I applies to latitudes from 7° N to 7° S; its period is the planet's shortest, at 9h 50 m 30.0s. System II applies at latitudes north and south of these; its period is 9h 55 m 40.6s. System III was defined by radio astronomers and corresponds to the rotation of the planet's magnetosphere; its period is Jupiter's official rotation.

Observation 

Jupiter is usually the fourth brightest object in the sky (after the Sun, the Moon, and Venus), although at opposition Mars can appear brighter than Jupiter. Depending on Jupiter's position with respect to the Earth, it can vary in visual magnitude from as bright as −2.94 at opposition down to −1.66 during conjunction with the Sun. The mean apparent magnitude is −2.20 with a standard deviation of 0.33. The angular diameter of Jupiter likewise varies from 50.1 to 30.5 arc seconds. Favourable oppositions occur when Jupiter is passing through the perihelion of its orbit, bringing it closer to Earth. Near opposition, Jupiter will appear to go into retrograde motion for a period of about 121 days, moving backward through an angle of 9.9° before returning to prograde movement.

Because the orbit of Jupiter is outside that of Earth, the phase angle of Jupiter as viewed from Earth is always less than 11.5°; thus, Jupiter always appears nearly fully illuminated when viewed through Earth-based telescopes. It was only during spacecraft missions to Jupiter that crescent views of the planet were obtained. A small telescope will usually show Jupiter's four Galilean moons and the prominent cloud belts across Jupiter's atmosphere. A larger telescope with an aperture of  will show Jupiter's Great Red Spot when it faces Earth.

History

Pre-telescopic research 

Observation of Jupiter dates back to at least the Babylonian astronomers of the 7th or 8th century BC. The ancient Chinese knew Jupiter as the "Suì Star" and established their cycle of 12 earthly branches based on the approximate number of years it takes Jupiter to rotate around the Sun; the Chinese language still uses its name (simplified as ) when referring to years of age. By the 4th century BC, these observations had developed into the Chinese zodiac, and each year became associated with a Tai Sui star and god controlling the region of the heavens opposite Jupiter's position in the night sky. These beliefs survive in some Taoist religious practices and in the East Asian zodiac's twelve animals. The Chinese historian Xi Zezong has claimed that Gan De, an ancient Chinese astronomer, reported a small star "in alliance" with the planet, which may indicate a sighting of one of Jupiter's moons with the unaided eye. If true, this would predate Galileo's discovery by nearly two millennia.

A 2016 paper reports that trapezoidal rule was used by Babylonians before 50 BCE for integrating the velocity of Jupiter along the ecliptic. In his 2nd century work the Almagest, the Hellenistic astronomer Claudius Ptolemaeus constructed a geocentric planetary model based on deferents and epicycles to explain Jupiter's motion relative to Earth, giving its orbital period around Earth as 4332.38 days, or 11.86 years.

Ground-based telescope research 

In 1610, Italian polymath Galileo Galilei discovered the four largest moons of Jupiter (now known as the Galilean moons) using a telescope. This is thought to be the first telescopic observation of moons other than Earth's. Just one day after Galileo, Simon Marius independently discovered moons around Jupiter, though he did not publish his discovery in a book until 1614. It was Marius's names for the major moons, however, that stuck: Io, Europa, Ganymede, and Callisto. The discovery was a major point in favour of Copernicus' heliocentric theory of the motions of the planets; Galileo's outspoken support of the Copernican theory led to him being tried and condemned by the Inquisition.

During the 1660s, Giovanni Cassini used a new telescope to discover spots and colourful bands in Jupiter's atmosphere, observe that the planet appeared oblate, and estimate its rotation period. In 1692, Cassini noticed that the atmosphere undergoes differential rotation.

The Great Red Spot may have been observed as early as 1664 by Robert Hooke and in 1665 by Cassini, although this is disputed. The pharmacist Heinrich Schwabe produced the earliest known drawing to show details of the Great Red Spot in 1831. The Red Spot was reportedly lost from sight on several occasions between 1665 and 1708 before becoming quite conspicuous in 1878. It was recorded as fading again in 1883 and at the start of the 20th century.

Both Giovanni Borelli and Cassini made careful tables of the motions of Jupiter's moons, which allowed predictions of when the moons would pass before or behind the planet. By the 1670s, Cassini observed that when Jupiter was on the opposite side of the Sun from Earth, these events would occur about 17 minutes later than expected. Ole Rømer deduced that light does not travel instantaneously (a conclusion that Cassini had earlier rejected), and this timing discrepancy was used to estimate the speed of light.

In 1892, E. E. Barnard observed a fifth satellite of Jupiter with the  refractor at Lick Observatory in California. This moon was later named Amalthea. It was the last planetary moon to be discovered directly by a visual observer through a telescope. An additional eight satellites were discovered before the flyby of the Voyager 1 probe in 1979.

In 1932, Rupert Wildt identified absorption bands of ammonia and methane in the spectra of Jupiter. Three long-lived anticyclonic features called "white ovals" were observed in 1938. For several decades they remained as separate features in the atmosphere, sometimes approaching each other but never merging. Finally, two of the ovals merged in 1998, then absorbed the third in 2000, becoming Oval BA.

Space-based telescope research 
On July 14, 2022, NASA presented images of Jupiter and related areas captured, for the first time, and including infrared views, by the James Webb Space Telescope (JWST).

Radiotelescope research 

In 1955, Bernard Burke and Kenneth Franklin discovered that Jupiter emits bursts of radio waves at a frequency of 22.2 MHz. The period of these bursts matched the rotation of the planet, and they used this information to determine a more precise value for Jupiter's rotation rate. Radio bursts from Jupiter were found to come in two forms: long bursts (or L-bursts) lasting up to several seconds, and short bursts (or S-bursts) lasting less than a hundredth of a second.

Scientists have discovered three forms of radio signals transmitted from Jupiter:
 Decametric radio bursts (with a wavelength of tens of metres) vary with the rotation of Jupiter, and are influenced by the interaction of Io with Jupiter's magnetic field.
 Decimetric radio emission (with wavelengths measured in centimetres) was first observed by Frank Drake and Hein Hvatum in 1959. The origin of this signal is a torus-shaped belt around Jupiter's equator, which generates cyclotron radiation from electrons that are accelerated in Jupiter's magnetic field.
 Thermal radiation is produced by heat in the atmosphere of Jupiter.

Exploration 

Jupiter has been visited by automated spacecraft since 1973, when the space probe Pioneer 10 passed close enough to Jupiter to send back revelations about its properties and phenomena. Missions to Jupiter are accomplished at a cost in energy, which is described by the net change in velocity of the spacecraft, or delta-v. Entering a Hohmann transfer orbit from Earth to Jupiter from low Earth orbit requires a delta-v of 6.3 km/s, which is comparable to the 9.7 km/s delta-v needed to reach low Earth orbit. Gravity assists through planetary flybys can be used to reduce the energy required to reach Jupiter.

Flyby missions 

Beginning in 1973, several spacecraft have performed planetary flyby manoeuvres that brought them within observation range of Jupiter. The Pioneer missions obtained the first close-up images of Jupiter's atmosphere and several of its moons. They discovered that the radiation fields near the planet were much stronger than expected, but both spacecraft managed to survive in that environment. The trajectories of these spacecraft were used to refine the mass estimates of the Jovian system. Radio occultations by the planet resulted in better measurements of Jupiter's diameter and the amount of polar flattening.

Six years later, the Voyager missions vastly improved the understanding of the Galilean moons and discovered Jupiter's rings. They also confirmed that the Great Red Spot was anticyclonic. Comparison of images showed that the Spot had changed hue since the Pioneer missions, turning from orange to dark brown. A torus of ionized atoms was discovered along Io's orbital path, which were found to come from erupting volcanoes on the moon's surface. As the spacecraft passed behind the planet, it observed flashes of lightning in the night side atmosphere.

The next mission to encounter Jupiter was the Ulysses solar probe. In February 1992, it performed a flyby manoeuvre to attain a polar orbit around the Sun. During this pass, the spacecraft studied Jupiter's magnetosphere, although it had no cameras to photograph the planet. The spacecraft passed by Jupiter six years later, this time at a much greater distance.

In 2000, the Cassini probe flew by Jupiter on its way to Saturn, and provided higher-resolution images.

The New Horizons probe flew by Jupiter in 2007 for a gravity assist en route to Pluto. The probe's cameras measured plasma output from volcanoes on Io and studied all four Galilean moons in detail.

Galileo mission 

The first spacecraft to orbit Jupiter was the Galileo mission, which reached the planet on December 7, 1995. It remained in orbit for over seven years, conducting multiple flybys of all the Galilean moons and Amalthea. The spacecraft also witnessed the impact of Comet Shoemaker–Levy 9 when it collided with Jupiter in 1994. Some of the goals for the mission were thwarted due to a malfunction in Galileo'''s high-gain antenna.

A 340-kilogram titanium atmospheric probe was released from the spacecraft in July 1995, entering Jupiter's atmosphere on December 7. It parachuted through  of the atmosphere at a speed of about 2,575 km/h (1600 mph) and collected data for 57.6 minutes until the spacecraft was destroyed. The Galileo orbiter itself experienced a more rapid version of the same fate when it was deliberately steered into the planet on September 21, 2003. NASA destroyed the spacecraft in order to avoid any possibility of the spacecraft crashing into and possibly contaminating the moon Europa, which may harbour life.

Data from this mission revealed that hydrogen composes up to 90% of Jupiter's atmosphere. The recorded temperature was more than 300 °C (570 °F) and the windspeed measured more than 644 km/h (>400 mph) before the probes vaporized.

 Juno mission 

NASA's Juno mission arrived at Jupiter on July 4, 2016 with the goal of studying the planet in detail from a polar orbit. The spacecraft was originally intended to orbit Jupiter thirty-seven times over a period of twenty months. During the mission, the spacecraft will be exposed to high levels of radiation from Jupiter's magnetosphere, which may cause future failure of certain instruments. On August 27, 2016, the spacecraft completed its first fly-by of Jupiter and sent back the first-ever images of Jupiter's north pole.Juno completed 12 orbits before the end of its budgeted mission plan, ending July 2018. In June of that year, NASA extended the mission operations plan to July 2021, and in January of that year the mission was extended to September 2025 with four lunar flybys: one of Ganymede, one of Europa, and two of Io. When Juno reaches the end of the mission, it will perform a controlled deorbit and disintegrate into Jupiter's atmosphere. This will avoid the risk of collision with Jupiter's moons.

 Cancelled missions and future plans 
There is great interest in missions to study Jupiter's larger icy moons, which may have subsurface liquid oceans. Funding difficulties have delayed progress, causing NASA's JIMO (Jupiter Icy Moons Orbiter) to be cancelled in 2005. A subsequent proposal was developed for a joint NASA/ESA mission called EJSM/Laplace, with a provisional launch date around 2020. EJSM/Laplace would have consisted of the NASA-led Jupiter Europa Orbiter and the ESA-led Jupiter Ganymede Orbiter. However, the ESA formally ended the partnership in April 2011, citing budget issues at NASA and the consequences on the mission timetable. Instead, ESA planned to go ahead with a European-only mission to compete in its L1 Cosmic Vision selection. These plans have been realized as the European Space Agency's Jupiter Icy Moon Explorer (JUICE), due to launch in 2023, followed by NASA's Europa Clipper mission, scheduled for launch in 2024.

Other proposed missions include the Chinese National Space Administration's Tianwen-4 mission which aims to launch an orbiter to the Jovian system and possibly Callisto around 2035, and CNSA's Interstellar Express and NASA's Interstellar Probe, which would both use Jupiter's gravity to help them reach the edges of the heliosphere.

 Moons 

Jupiter has 95 known natural satellites. Of these, 79 are less than 10 km in diameter. The four largest moons are Io, Europa, Ganymede, and Callisto, collectively known as the "Galilean moons", and are visible from Earth with binoculars on a clear night.

 Galilean moons 

The moons discovered by Galileo—Io, Europa, Ganymede, and Callisto—are among the largest in the Solar System. The orbits of Io, Europa, and Ganymede form a pattern known as a Laplace resonance; for every four orbits that Io makes around Jupiter, Europa makes exactly two orbits and Ganymede makes exactly one. This resonance causes the gravitational effects of the three large moons to distort their orbits into elliptical shapes, because each moon receives an extra tug from its neighbours at the same point in every orbit it makes. The tidal force from Jupiter, on the other hand, works to circularize their orbits.

The eccentricity of their orbits causes regular flexing of the three moons' shapes, with Jupiter's gravity stretching them out as they approach it and allowing them to spring back to more spherical shapes as they swing away. The friction created by this tidal flexing generates heat in the interior of the moons. This is seen most dramatically in the volcanic activity of Io (which is subject to the strongest tidal forces), and to a lesser degree in the geological youth of Europa's surface, which indicates recent resurfacing of the moon's exterior.

 Classification 

Jupiter's moons were traditionally classified into four groups of four, based on their similar orbital elements. This picture has been complicated by the discovery of numerous small outer moons since 1999. Jupiter's moons are currently divided into several different groups, although there are several moons which are not part of any group.

The eight innermost regular moons, which have nearly circular orbits near the plane of Jupiter's equator, are thought to have formed alongside Jupiter, whilst the remainder are irregular moons and are thought to be captured asteroids or fragments of captured asteroids. The irregular moons within each group may have a common origin, perhaps as a larger moon or captured body that broke up.

 Interaction with the Solar System 
As the most massive of the eight planets, the gravitational influence of Jupiter has helped shape the Solar System. With the exception of Mercury, the orbits of the system's planets lie closer to Jupiter's orbital plane than the Sun's equatorial plane. The Kirkwood gaps in the asteroid belt are mostly caused by Jupiter, and the planet may have been responsible for the purported Late Heavy Bombardment in the inner Solar System's history.

In addition to its moons, Jupiter's gravitational field controls numerous asteroids that have settled around the Lagrangian points that precede and follow the planet in its orbit around the Sun. These are known as the Trojan asteroids, and are divided into Greek and Trojan "camps" to honour the Iliad. The first of these, 588 Achilles, was discovered by Max Wolf in 1906; since then more than two thousand have been discovered. The largest is 624 Hektor.

The Jupiter family is defined as comets that have a semi-major axis smaller than Jupiter's; most short-period comets belong to this group. Members of the Jupiter family are thought to form in the Kuiper belt outside the orbit of Neptune. During close encounters with Jupiter, they are perturbed into orbits with a smaller period, which then becomes circularized by regular gravitational interaction with the Sun and Jupiter.

 Impacts 

Jupiter has been called the Solar System's vacuum cleaner because of its immense gravity well and location near the inner Solar System. There are more impacts on Jupiter, such as comets, than on any other planet in the Solar System. For example, Jupiter experiences about 200 times more asteroid and comet impacts than Earth. In the past, scientists believed that Jupiter partially shielded the inner system from cometary bombardment. However, computer simulations in 2008 suggest that Jupiter does not cause a net decrease in the number of comets that pass through the inner Solar System, as its gravity perturbs their orbits inward roughly as often as it accretes or ejects them. This topic remains controversial among scientists, as some think it draws comets towards Earth from the Kuiper belt, while others believes that Jupiter protects Earth from the Oort cloud.

In July 1994, the Comet Shoemaker–Levy 9 comet collided with Jupiter. The impacts were closely observed by observatories around the world, including the Hubble Space Telescope and Galileo spacecraft. The event was widely covered by the media.

Surveys of early astronomical records and drawings produced eight examples of potential impact observations between 1664 and 1839. However, a 1997 review determined that these observations had little or no possibility of being the results of impacts. Further investigation by this team revealed a dark surface feature discovered by astronomer Giovanni Cassini in 1690 may have been an impact scar.

 In culture 

The planet Jupiter has been known since ancient times. It is visible to the naked eye in the night sky and can occasionally be seen in the daytime when the Sun is low. To the Babylonians, this planet represented their god Marduk, chief of their pantheon from the Hammurabi period. They used Jupiter's roughly 12-year orbit along the ecliptic to define the constellations of their zodiac.

The mythical Greek name for this planet is Zeus (Ζεύς), also referred to as Dias (Δίας), the planetary name of which is retained in modern Greek. The ancient Greeks knew the planet as Phaethon, meaning "shining one" or "blazing star". The Greek myths of Zeus from the Homeric period showed particular similarities to certain Near-Eastern gods, including the Semitic El and Baal, the Sumerian Enlil, and the Babylonian god Marduk. The association between the planet and the Greek deity Zeus was drawn from Near Eastern influences and was fully established by the fourth century BCE, as documented in the Epinomis of Plato and his contemporaries.

The god Jupiter is the Roman counterpart of Zeus, and he is the principal god of Roman mythology. The Romans originally called Jupiter the "star of Jupiter" (Iuppiter Stella)," as they believed it to be sacred to its namesake god. This name comes from the Proto-Indo-European vocative compound *Dyēu-pəter (nominative: *Dyēus-pətēr, meaning "Father Sky-God", or "Father Day-God"). As the supreme god of the Roman pantheon, Jupiter was the god of thunder, lightning, and storms, and appropriately called the god of light and sky.

In Vedic astrology, Hindu astrologers named the planet after Brihaspati, the religious teacher of the gods, and often called it "Guru", which means the "Teacher". In Central Asian Turkic myths, Jupiter is called Erendiz or Erentüz, from eren (of uncertain meaning) and yultuz ("star"). The Turks calculated the period of the orbit of Jupiter as 11 years and 300 days. They believed that some social and natural events connected to Erentüz's movements on the sky. The Chinese, Vietnamese, Koreans, and Japanese called it the "wood star", based on the Chinese Five Elements. In China it became known as the "Year-star" (Sui-sing) as Chinese astronomers noted that it jumped one zodiac constellation each year (with corrections). In some ancient Chinese writings the years were named, at least in principle, in correlation with the Jovian zodiacal signs.

 Gallery 

 See also 

 
 
 
 
 
 

 Notes 

 References 

 External links 

 
  – A simulation of the 62 moons of Jupiter.
 Jupiter in Motion, album of Juno'' imagery stitched into short videos
 June 2010 impact video
 Photographs of Jupiter circa 1920s from the Lick Observatory Records Digital Archive, UC Santa Cruz Library's Digital Collections 
 Interactive 3D gravity simulation of the Jovian system 
 Video (animation; 4:00): Flyby of Ganymede and Jupiter (NASA; 15 July 2021).

 
Articles containing video clips
Astronomical objects known since antiquity
Gas giants
Outer planets